St. Leonides of Alexandria was a Greek early Christian martyr who lived in the second and early third centuries AD.

Biography 
According to the Christian historian Eusebius, Leonides' son was the early Church father Origen. Eusebius also says that he was of Greek nationality. In the same passage Eusebius tells us that Leonides was martyred during the persecution of the Roman emperor Septimius Severus in the year 202 AD.  

Condemned to death by the Egyptian prefect Lactus, he was beheaded, and his property seized.

Family 
The name of Leonides' wife is unknown, but she bore at least six children after Origen. 

Porphyry, a Neoplatonist, claims Origen's parents were pagans.

Leonides catechized his children well. Origen attempted to follow his father in martyrdom, but he was detained by his mother - it is said that she hid his clothes so that Origen could not leave the house.

Feast 
The Catholic feast of Leonides is celebrated on April 22.

See also 
Chronological list of saints in the 3rd century

References

Executed Egyptian people
3rd-century Christian martyrs
2nd-century births
202 deaths